Auguste Fernbach (2 March 1860 – 26 January 1939) was a French biologist.

Life 
Fernbach worked as a biologist in France. The Fernbach flask is named after him.

References

External links 
 
 Pasteur Institute:Auguste Fernbach

French biologists
1860 births
1939 deaths